Mark Richard Grieb (born May 23, 1974) is a former Arena football quarterback who spent the majority of his career with the San Jose SaberCats of the Arena Football League (AFL). Grieb currently serves as the head coach of the Sacred Heart Prep Gators football team in Atherton, California. He was a 13-year veteran of the AFL, having played quarterback for the Anaheim Piranhas (1997) and San Jose SaberCats (1999–2008, 2011–2012). Grieb also played in NFL Europe for the Scottish Claymores (1998) and in the XFL with the Las Vegas Outlaws (2001). Grieb is the second quarterback in AFL history to throw for over 47,000 yards, over 900 touchdowns, over 3,800 completions, and over 10,000 pass attempts. He officially retired on November 8, 2012. He played college football at University of California, Davis. Grieb passed for 48,080 yards between the Arena League, XFL and NFL Europe.

Grieb appeared in three ArenaBowls, winning titles in 2002, 2004 and 2007.

High school career
Grieb attended Oak Grove High School in San Jose, California, where he was a student and a three-sport athlete in football, basketball, and baseball.

College career
Grieb played college football at UC Davis. He finished his career in the school's top 10 in six different offensive categories. As a senior, he passed for a school-record 3,230 yards and 25 touchdowns, and earned First-team CoSIDA All-Region honors, was a Football Gazette All-American pick, and was a finalist for the Harlon Hill Trophy, which is given to the NCAA Division II college football MVP.

Professional career
In 1997, Grieb signed with the Anaheim Piranhas of the Arena Football League. Later that season he was traded to the Milwaukee Mustangs, and spent 1998 with the Scottish Claymores of NFL Europe before returning to Arena football with the San Jose SaberCats for the 1999 season, where he remained the rest of his career. With the SaberCats, he has appeared in four ArenaBowls and wins in the 2002, 2004, and 2007, although in 2002, on his way to completing an AFL regular season record 13–1 year, he was injured against the Arizona Rattlers, sustaining a season-ending broken collarbone. John Dutton, Grieb's backup at the time, took over and continued to help lead the team to the ArenaBowl, winning it against the same Rattlers. In 2004, Grieb was able to stay healthy and help lead the SaberCats to another win the ArenaBowl against the Rattlers. In 2008, he helped lead the SaberCats to yet another ArenaBowl appearance, in ArenaBowl XXII, a 59–56 loss to the Philadelphia Soul. After the 2008 season the league was suspended for 2009 with Grieb a free agent. In 2011, when the SaberCats started back up, they signed Grieb back to the team for his 11th season with the team. Grieb played through the 2012 season, announcing his retirement on November 8, 2012.

For a brief period in March 2001, after the Las Vegas Outlaws of the XFL lost all three of their quarterbacks (Chuck Clements, Ryan Clement and Mike Cawley) to injuries, the Outlaws signed Grieb as an emergency backup. Grieb started several games for the Outlaws, amassing 408 passing yards. Grieb was given an angle of being a young man signed off the street who was pursuing his MBA, ignoring his career in arena football.

Records and awards
Grieb holds several records in AFL history including: 
 Pass completion percentage for one year: 73%
 Passer rating for one year: 133.5
 Career passer rating: 121.93

Coaching career
On April 3, 2013, Grieb was named the head football coach at Menlo College. In February 2015, Menlo dropped its football program. On April 26, 2017, Grieb was named the head football coach at Atherton's Sacred Heart Preparatory.

In 2021, Grieb led the SHP Gators to their first state championship title, winning the CIF Division 5A crown. They also won the CCS Division 4 and CIF NorCal 5A titles en route to the state championship.

Teaching career
Grieb briefly taught chemistry at San Mateo High School. Grieb taught chemistry and biology at Gunn High School before departing for Sacred Heart Prep's head football coaching position.

Head coaching record

References

1974 births
Living people
American football quarterbacks
Anaheim Piranhas players
Las Vegas Outlaws (XFL) players
Menlo Oaks football coaches
Milwaukee Mustangs (1994–2001) players
San Jose SaberCats players
Scottish Claymores players
Stanford Cardinal football coaches
UC Davis Aggies football players
Junior college football coaches in the United States
High school football coaches in California
Players of American football from San Jose, California
Players of American football from Torrance, California